The Sweden Solar System is the world's largest permanent scale model of the Solar System. The Sun is represented by the Avicii Arena in Stockholm, the largest hemispherical building in the world. The inner planets can also be found in Stockholm but the outer planets are situated northward in other cities along the Baltic Sea. The system was started by Nils Brenning, professor at the Royal Institute of Technology in Stockholm, and Gösta Gahm, professor at the Stockholm University. The model represents the Solar System on the scale of 1:20 million.

The system
The bodies represented in this model include the Sun, the planets (and some of their moons), dwarf planets and many types of small bodies (comets, asteroids, trans-Neptunians, etc.), as well as some abstract concepts (like the Termination Shock zone). Because of the existence of many small bodies in the real Solar System, the model can always be further increased.

The Sun is represented by the Avicii Arena (Globen), Stockholm, which is the largest hemispherical building in the world,  in diameter. To respect the scale, the globe represents the Sun including its corona.

Inner planets

 Mercury ( in diameter) is placed at Stockholm City Museum,  from the Globe. The small metallic sphere was built by the artist Peter Varhelyi.
 Venus ( in diameter) is placed at Vetenskapens Hus at KTH (Royal Institute of Technology),  from the Globe. The previous model, made by the United States artist Daniel Oberti, was inaugurated on 8 June 2004, during a Venus transit and placed at KTH. It fell and shattered around 11 June 2011. Due to construction work at the location of the previous model of Venus it was removed and as of October 2012 cannot be seen. The current model now at Vetenskapens Hus was previously located at the Observatory Museum in Stockholm (now closed).
 Earth ( in diameter) is located at the Swedish Museum of Natural History (Cosmonova),  from the Globe. Satellite images of the Earth are exhibited beside the Globe. An elaborate model of the Moon ( in diameter) is on display in another part of the museum.
 Mars ( in diameter) is located at Mörby centrum, a shopping centre and Stockholm metro station in Danderyd, a suburb of Stockholm. The model, made in copper by the Finnish artist Heikki Haapanen, is connected by an "umbilical cord" to a steel plate on the floor having an Earth image. The globe also features marks that represent some typical Martian chemical elements.

Gas giants
 Jupiter ( in diameter) is placed inside the Clarion Hotel located at Stockholm Arlanda Airport in Sigtuna Municipality,  from the Globe. Previously, it was made as a flower decoration, with different flowers representing different zones of the giant gas planet. Today, the planet is depicted as a ring light above a lobby.
 Saturn ( in diameter) is placed outside the old observatory of Anders Celsius, in the so-called Celsius Square, in the centre of Uppsala,  from the Globe. Inaugurated during the International Year of Astronomy, the model is a mat with a picture of Saturn, but will eventually grow to crown a school planetarium in the city. In addition, several schools in Uppsala are to provide moons of Saturn: the first completed was Enceladus (diameter ) at Kvarngärdesskolan.
 Uranus ( in diameter) was vandalized and the new model was reconstructed behind Stora magasinet in Lövstabruk in 2012. It is an outdoor model made of blue steel bars. The rotation axis of the planet is marked in red.

 Neptune (2.5 m in diameter) is located by the river Söderhamnsån in Söderhamn, a coast town with tradition of fishing and sailing (which relates to Neptune being the deity of the seas). Placed  from the Globe, the model is made of acrylic and, at night, shines with a blue light.

Trans-Neptunian objects
 Pluto ( in diameter) and its largest moon Charon are placed near the southern of the Dellen lakes, in Delsbo,  from the Globe. The lakes are thought to be formed by a meteorite impact 90 million years ago. The two bodies' sculptures are supported by two gravelike pillars (as Pluto is the deity for death), made up with dellenite, a rare mineral formed at that place by the meteorite impact.
Haumea (8.5cm (3.3 in) in diameter) and its moons are depicted in the 2047 Science Centre, Borlänge, 200 km (124 mi) from the Globe.
Quaoar (6cm (2.4 in) in diameter) is located in the library in Gislaved, 340 km from the Globe.
 Ixion ( in diameter), a dwarf planet candidate, is located at Technichus, a science center in Härnösand, 360 km (224 mi) from the Globe. The sculpture is an orb held by a hand with the arm. This plutino was discovered by a team which included scientists from Uppsala.
Makemake (7cm (2.8 in) in diameter) is located at Slottsskogsobservatoriet, an observatory in Gothenburg, 400 km (249 mi) from the Globe.
'Oumuamua (0.3 mm (0.012 in) in diameter) is placed in the village of Plönninge, Halland, 440 km (273 mi) from the Globe.
Gonggong (7.5 cm (3.0 in) in diameter) is placed near the Tycho Brahe Observatory in Oxie, Malmö, 500 km (311 mi) from the Globe.
 Eris ( in diameter) is located at Umestans Företagspark, Umeå,  from the Globe. Made by Theresa Berg, the golden model is inspired by the mythical story of Eris sparking a quarrel between three Greek goddesses with a golden apple bearing the inscription καλλίστῃ ("to the most beautiful one").
 Sedna ( in diameter), another dwarf planet candidate, is located at Teknikens Hus, a science center in Luleå,  from the Globe.

Other bodies

 The near-Earth Object Eros is located at Mörbyskolan, a school in Danderyd Municipality (where Mars is located),  from the Globe. It was created as a Valentine's Day project in gold, modeled after Eros, the god of love.  The dimensions are 2 × 0.7 × 0.7 mm.
 The asteroid 36614 Saltis is located at Saltsjöbaden's Kunskapsskola, a school near the Stockholm Observatory. The asteroid was discovered by A. Brandeker in 2000, using a telescope at the observatory, and the body was named after the observatory's location, Saltsjöbaden.
 The asteroid Vesta is located at Åva gymnasium, a public secondary school in Täby.
 The asteroid Palomar-Leiden ( in diameter) is located in a park in Alsike, Knivsta Municipality,  from the Globe. It is not a sculpture but a dot on a map of the System, placed in front of Erik Ståhl's monumental cosmic sculptures.
 Halley's Comet is located at Balthazar Science Center, in Skövde. Inaugurated on 16 December 2009, there are actually four models of the comet: three placed outdoors, based on schoolchildren's drawings, plus one indoors, consisting of a laser passing through a block of glass.
 Comet Swift-Tuttle is placed at Kreativum, a science center in Karlshamn.
 The Termination Shock is at the edge of the heliosphere: it is the boundary where the solar wind transitions to subsonic velocity. No sculpture currently represents the termination shock, but a foundation for a future sculpture exists at the Institute of Space Physics,  from the Globe, in Kiruna, above the Arctic Circle.

List of objects

Gallery

See also

 Nine Views
 Somerset Space Walk

References

External links

 Sweden Solar System's webpage

Scale modeling
Space art
Science and technology in Sweden
Buildings and structures in Sweden
Tourist attractions in Sweden
Solar System models